Amber Mountain may refer to:

Amber Mountain (Alberta), a mountain in Canada
Amber Mountain National Park, a protected area in Madagascar